Donald A. Robert (born 15 May 1959) is an American businessman. He is the chairman of Experian plc, a global information services group with operations in 41 countries.

Early life
Robert has a BSc degree in business administration from Oregon State University.

Career
He joined Experian North America in 2001 and was chief executive of Experian (in London) from 1 January 2007 until July 2014, when he was appointed chairman and replaced by Brian Cassin as chief executive.

Personal life
He and his wife Jennifer have two children.

References

1959 births
Living people
American chief executives
American corporate directors
Oregon State University alumni
Businesspeople from Portland, Oregon
20th-century American businesspeople